Valkarkay is a bay in the very north of Chaunsky District, Chukotka, Russia on the Chukchi Sea.  It is the site of a polar weather station established in 1932 and was the primary location used in the film How I Ended This Summer.

References

Bays of Chukotka Autonomous Okrug
Bays of the East Siberian Sea